SS E. Kirby Smith was a Liberty ship built in the United States during World War II. She was named after E. Kirby Smith, a career United States Army officer who fought in the Mexican–American War, and for the Confederacy in the Civil War, rising to the rank of General in the CSA.

Construction
E. Kirby Smith was laid down on 9 July 1942, under a Maritime Commission (MARCOM) contract, MC hull 1519, by J.A. Jones Construction, Panama City, Florida; sponsored by Mrs. Raymond A. Jones, wife of Raymond A. Jones, vice president and general manager, JAJCC, she was launched on 30 December 1942.

History
She was allocated to Marine Transport Lines, on 3 March 1943. On 23 May 1946, she was laid up in the James River Reserve Fleet, Lee Hall, Virginia. On 27 May 1954, she was withdrawn from the fleet to be loaded with grain under the "Grain Program 1954", she returned loaded on 21 June 1954. On 16 March 1956, she was withdrawn to be unload, she returned on empty 23 April 1956. On 18 July 1956, she was sold for $147,777.77 to Boston Metals Co., to be scrapped. She was removed from the fleet on 25 July 1956.

References

Bibliography

 
 
 
 

 

Liberty ships
Ships built in Panama City, Florida
1943 ships
James River Reserve Fleet
James River Reserve Fleet Grain Program